Lepista pandula is a moth of the subfamily Arctiinae. It was described by Jean Baptiste Boisduval in 1847. It is found in Kenya, Malawi, Mozambique, Somalia, South Africa, Tanzania and Uganda.

References

 

Lithosiini
Moths described in 1847
Moths of Sub-Saharan Africa